Daphnella wui is a species of sea snail, a marine gastropod mollusc in the family Raphitomidae.

Description

Distribution
This marine species occurs off Taiwan.

References

 Liu J.Y. [Ruiyu] (ed.)(2008). Checklist of marine biota of China seas. China Science Press. 1267 pp.

External links
 

wui
Gastropods described in 2001